Dithizone is a sulfur-containing organic compound. It is a good ligand, and forms complexes with many toxic metals such as lead, thallium and mercury.

Dithizone may be prepared by reacting phenylhydrazine with carbon disulfide, followed by reaction with potassium hydroxide.

Dithizone is used to assess the purity of human pancreatic islet preparations used for transplantation into patients with type 1 diabetes. Dithizone binds zinc ions present in the islet's beta cells, and therefore stains the islets red. Exocrine tissue also present in the preparations does not bind dithizone, and is therefore not stained.

References

Thiocarbonyl compounds